Side by Side is a British sitcom starring Gareth Hunt and Louisa Rix that was broadcast for two series from 1992 to 1993. It was written by Richard Ommanney, who had also written Three Up, Two Down.

Cast
Gareth Hunt – Vince Tulley
Louisa Rix – Gilly Bell
Julia Deakin – Stella Tulley
Mia Fothergill – Katie Bell
Alex Walkinshaw – Terry Shane

Plot
Vince Tulley is a successful and relatively wealthy plumber who lives in Kingston upon Thames in Surrey, with his wife Stella. He enjoys adding bizarre and unusual features to both the inside and outside of his house, including a windmill and mock Acropolis. His neighbour, Gilly Bell, is recently widowed and bringing up her daughter Katie. Gilly hates Vince's additions as she feels he is bringing down the tone of the neighbourhood, although she gets on very well with Vince's easy-going wife, Stella. Terry Shane, Vince's nephew and assistant, has a love-hate relationship with Katie.

Episodes
Series One had six episodes, which aired weekly from 27 April until 1 June 1992.  Series Two had seven episodes, which aired weekly from 18 February until 1 April 1993.

References
Mark Lewisohn, "Radio Times Guide to TV Comedy", BBC Worldwide Ltd, 2003

External links 
 

1992 British television series debuts
1993 British television series endings
1990s British comedy television series
BBC television sitcoms
English-language television shows